The 2020-21 Belgian Women's Super League season was the 6th edition since its establishment in 2015. It started on 28 August 2020 and final was played on 29 May 2021. However, the competition was cut short due to a COVID-19 outbreak.Anderlecht were the defending champions.

Changes from 2019-20 
In light of further professionalising women's football in Belgium, several changes were introduced through RBFA's "The World at our Feet" project.The six teams of the previous years (Anderlecht, Club YLA, AA Gent, KRC Genk, OH Leuven and Standard Liège) were joined by both champion and runner-up of the 1st National division: Eendracht Aalst and White Star Woluwe respectively. Zulte-Waregem and Charleroi completed the list of 10 teams, ensuring a larger geographical spread of the women's teams at the highest level.
The Women's Super League also received a brand new visual identity and logo. Interactive content is provided via new Facebook , Instagram  and Twitter  accounts.

All 10 teams play each other twice in a regular competition, for a total of 18 matches. The final standings are than divided in 2 groups, with the top 5 teams competing in Play-off 1 and the bottom 5 in Play-off 2.
Each team in each Play-off starts with half their points from the regular competition, rounded up. The 5 teams than play a total of 8 matches to determine the final rankings.

Teams

Stadia and locations

Standings

Regular competition

Play-off 1

Play-off 2

Top goalscorers

Regular competition

Play-off 1

Play-off 2

References

External links 
 Official website
 Footystats
 Soccerway

2020–21 in Belgian women's football